The Maserati MC20 (Maserati Corse 2020, internal code M240) is a two-seater, mid-engined sports car produced by Italian car manufacturer Maserati.

MC20 was originally scheduled to debut in May 2020. Maserati announced a racing variant to be also offered. The Maserati Innovation Lab was responsible for the development of the new car and an electric option will also be produced. Maserati is also testing a fully electric powertrain. The new sports car will be produced at the Maserati Modena plant that is undergoing necessary modernization. The new car's logo appeared on a Maserati-sponsored Multi 70 trimaran's mainsail that was due to race in the RORC Caribbean 600. The debut along with brand redesign was rescheduled for September 2020 in Modena.

Development

Test mules 
In late 2019, a series of spy shots were published showing a highly modified Alfa Romeo 4C-based test mule of an upcoming, new Maserati sports car. Apart for the typical camouflage, the car featured a much larger rear portion and wider track.

The following statements from the manufacturer confirmed that the cars were used as prototypes of a new powertrain developed by Maserati, but it was not confirmed whether the new sports car will be based on the outgoing 4C platform.

Prototypes 
As of March 2020, Maserati has completed their first prototype, ready for road and track testing.

On 13 May 2020 a Maserati MC20 pays homage to Sir Stirling Moss, who died on 12 April 2020 at the age of 90. A prototype of the MC20 was covered with the graphics commemorating Stirling Moss and the Maserati 420M/58 "Eldorado", an iconic single-seater brought to its debut in 1958 on the occasion of the Race of Two Worlds on Monza circuit.

Specifications

Engine 

On 1 July 2020, Maserati announced a six-cylinder engine for the MC20. The engine was described as a 90-degree,  V6 with a dry sump, twin-spark and pre-chamber ignition system. It also has dual turbochargers and fuel injectors. It redlines at 8,000 rpm.

On 2 July 2020, Road & Track criticized a press release from Maserati that claimed the engine is "100% Maserati". The magazine countered that "it's not hard to see the connection to the Ferrari F154 engine and the Alfa Romeo 690T engine". Similarities include the 90-degree V angle, firing order of 1-6-3-4-2-5 (identical to the F154-based V6 engine found in the Alfa Romeo Giulia and Stelvio), arrangement of cooling passages, cylinders, and liners, oil filter mounting, bore and stroke, and rev limit of 8,000 rpm (the same as the Ferrari SF90 Stradale). However, the 11:1 compression ratio is unique, indicating the heads are new and Maserati-developed.

Interior

The interior features a steering wheel constructed mostly of carbon fiber, with Alcantara accents. There is a TFT 10.25 inch digital instrument cluster, and a 10.25 inch infotainment screen. The seats have leather seating surfaces on the bolsters and headrest, with the middle seating surface made from Alcantara.

Variants

Cielo (2022)
In 2022, the trident-branded marque unveiled the MC20 Cielo, a drop-top variant of the MC20 halo sports car. It features the same 3.0 litre twin-turbo V6 and styling, but adds on the two-piece foldable hard-top that has an electrochromic glass roof. The roof system weighs an additional 65 kg, and the folding & unfolding of the roof sequence takes only 12 seconds.

Motorsport 
Ahead of the 2022 24 hours of Spa, Maserati launched the MC20 GT2 intended for competition in the GT2 European Series in 2023.

References

External links

MC20
Cars introduced in 2020
Sports cars
Rear mid-engine, rear-wheel-drive vehicles
Production electric cars